Haylee Joanne Partridge (born  3 April 1981 in Lower Hutt) is a New Zealand cricketer who played 21 State League matches for the Northern Districts Spirit between 1999 and 2002.

References

External links
 
 

1981 births
Living people
New Zealand women cricketers
Northern Districts women cricketers
Cricketers from Lower Hutt